Gowdeyana punctifera is a species of soldier fly in the family Stratiomyidae. The range of this species includes the Canadian provinces of British Columbia, Saskatchewan, Ontario, and Quebec.

Distribution
United States, Canada, Mexico.

References

Stratiomyidae
Insects of Canada
Diptera of North America
Insects described in 1915
Taxa named by John Russell Malloch